The Town of Hempstead, historically known as South Hempstead, is the largest of the three towns in Nassau County (alongside North Hempstead and Oyster Bay) in the U.S. state of New York. It occupies the southwestern part of the county, on the western half of Long Island. Twenty-two incorporated villages (one of which is named Hempstead) are completely or partially within the town. The town's combined population was 759,757 at the 2010 census, which is the majority of the population of the county and by far the largest of any town in New York. In 2019, its combined population increased to an estimated 759,793 according to the American Community Survey.

If Hempstead were to be incorporated as a city, it would be the second-largest city in New York, behind New York City; it is about three times the size of Buffalo, which has long been the state's second-largest city. It would be the 18th-largest city in the country, behind San Francisco, California, and ahead of Seattle, Washington. Hempstead is thus the most populous municipality in the New York metropolitan area outside New York City.

Hofstra University's main campus is located in the Town of Hempstead.

History 
The town was first settled around 1644 following the establishment of a treaty between English colonists, John Carman and Robert Fordham, and the Lenape Indians in 1643. Although the settlers were from the English colony of Connecticut, a patent was issued by the government of New Netherland after the settlers had purchased land from the local natives. This transaction is depicted in a mural in the Hempstead Village Hall, reproduced from a poster commemorating the 300th anniversary of Hempstead Village.

In local Dutch-language documents of the 1640s and later, the town was invariably called Heemstede, and several of Hempstead's original 50 patentees were Dutch, suggesting that Hempstead was named after the Dutch town and/or castle Heemstede, which are near the cities of Haarlem and Amsterdam. However, the authorities possibly had Dutchified a name given by co-founder John Carman, who was born in 1606 in Hemel Hempstead, Hertfordshire, England, on land owned by his ancestors since the 13th century.

In 1664, the settlement under the new Province of New York adopted the Duke's Laws, austere statutes that became the basis upon which the laws of many colonies were to be founded. For a time, Hempstead became known as "Old Blue", as a result of the "Blue Laws".

During the American Revolution, the Loyalists in the south and the American sympathizers in the north caused a split in 1784 into "North Hempstead" and "South Hempstead". With the 1898 incorporation of the Borough of Queens as part of the city of New York, and the 1899 split of Queens County to create Nassau County, some southwestern portions of the Town of Hempstead seceded from the town and became part of the Borough of Queens.

Richard Hewlett, who was born in Hempstead, served as a Lieutenant Colonel with the British Army under General Oliver De Lancey in the American Revolution. Afterward, Hewlett departed the United States with other Loyalists and settled in the newly created Province of New Brunswick in what later became Canada. A settlement there was named Hampstead, in Queen's County next to Long Island in the Saint John River.

Geography 

According to the United States Census Bureau, the town has a total area of 191.3 square miles (495.5 km2), of which 120.0 square miles (310.7 km2)  is land and 71.4 square miles (184.8 km2)  (37.30%) is water.

The western town line is the border of Queens County in New York City. Its northern border, with the town of North Hempstead and the town of Oyster Bay, is along the main line of the Long Island Rail Road and along Old Country Road in Garden City heading east towards the Wantagh Parkway. Its eastern border, also with the town of Oyster Bay, runs parallel to (and several hundred feet west of) Route 107. To the south is the Atlantic Ocean, off of Atlantic Beach, Lido Beach, Point Lookout, and Jones Beach, as well as the city of Long Beach.

The most popular beach on the east coast of the United States, Jones Beach State Park, is located in Hempstead. The beach is a popular destination for Long Islanders and residents of New York. The beach itself receives approximately six million visitors per year.

Communities 
The town of Hempstead contains 22 villages and 38 hamlets:

Villages 

 Atlantic Beach
 Bellerose
 Cedarhurst
 East Rockaway
 Floral Park (small part in North Hempstead)
 Freeport
 Garden City  (small part in North Hempstead)
 Hempstead (village)
 Hewlett Bay Park
 Hewlett Harbor
 Hewlett Neck
 Island Park
 Lawrence
 Lynbrook
 Malverne
 Mineola (almost all in North Hempstead)
 New Hyde Park (part; with North Hempstead)
 Rockville Centre
 South Floral Park
 Stewart Manor
 Valley Stream
 Woodsburgh

Hamlets 

 Baldwin
 Baldwin Harbor
 Barnum Island
 Bay Park
 Bellerose Terrace
 Bellmore
 Bethpage (almost all in Oyster Bay)
 East Atlantic Beach
 East Garden City
 East Meadow
 Elmont
 Franklin Square
 Garden City South
 Harbor Isle
 Hewlett
 Inwood
 Lakeview
 Levittown
 Lido Beach
 Malverne Park Oaks
 Merrick
 Munson
 North Bellmore
 North Lynbrook
 North Merrick
 North Valley Stream
 North Wantagh
 North Woodmere
 Oceanside
 Point Lookout
 Roosevelt
 Salisbury (South Westbury)
 Seaford
 South Hempstead
 South Valley Stream
 Uniondale
 Wantagh
 West Hempstead
 Woodmere

In addition, there are a few areas that are not part of any incorporated village or census-designated place:
Jones Beach Island and nearby uninhabited islands in South Oyster Bay
 A small area between Lynbrook and Rockville Centre that contains only Rockville Cemetery

Demographics 

The 2019 American Community Survey determined the population of the town of Hempstead was 759,793. The racial and ethnic makeup of the town was 54.0% non-Hispanic white, 17.4% Black or African American, 0.3% American Indian or Alaska Native, 6.2% Asian, 3.7% multiracial, and 20.9% Hispanic or Latin American of any race.

Of the population, there were 244,203 households and there was an owner-occupied housing rate of 80.8%. The average household size was 3.10 and the population was made of 22.7% foreign-born residents. In 2019, the U.S. Census Bureau estimated the median value of an owner-occupied housing unit was $455,700 and the median gross rent of rented units at $1,678. Residents of the town had a combined median household income of $111,072 and per capita of $44,958. Of the population in 2019, 6.0% lived at or below the poverty line.

As of the census of 2010, there were 759,757 people, 246,828 households, and 193,513 families residing in the town. The population density was 6,301.3 inhabitants per square mile (2,433.0/km2).  There were 252,286 housing units at an average density of 2,103.0 per square mile (812.0/km2). The racial makeup of the town was 59.9% White, 16.5% Black, 0.3% Native American, 5.2% Asian, 0.03% Pacific Islander, 4.5% from other races, and 2.2% from two or more races. Hispanic and Latin Americans of any race were 17.4% of the population.

There were 246,828 households, out of which 36.5% had children under the age of 18 living with them, 62.2% were married couples living together, 12.3% had a female householder with no husband present, and 21.6% were non-families. 18.1% of all households were made up of individuals, and 9.2% had someone living alone who was 65 years of age or older. The average household size was 3.02 and the average family size was 3.41.

In the town, the population was spread out, with 25.4% under the age of 18, 7.8% from 18 to 24, 29.2% from 25 to 44, 23.4% from 45 to 64, and 14.1% who were 65 years of age or older.  The median age was 38 years. For every 100 females, there were 92.3 males.  For every 100 females age 18 and over, there were 88.2 males.

According to a 2007 estimate, the median income for a household in the town was $84,362, and the median income for a family was $96,080. Males had a median income of $50,818 versus $36,334 for females. The per capita income for the town was $28,153. About 4.0% of families and 5.8% of the population were below the poverty line, including 6.6% of those under age 18 and 5.7% of those age 65 or over.

Economy 
Lufthansa United States had its headquarters in East Meadow, beginning in the 1970s, after it moved from Park Avenue in Manhattan, in order to save money. In 2019, the office had 206 employees; that year the headquarters moved to Uniondale.

At one time Swiss International Air Lines operated its United States office at 776 RexCorp Plaza in the EAB Plaza in Uniondale. The airline moved from 41 Pinelawn Road in Melville, Suffolk County around 2002.

Snapple was previously headquartered in East Meadow, prior to moving their corporate office. The office space is now currently occupied by the Epilepsy Foundation of Long Island.

Government and politics 
The town is headed by Donald X. Clavin, Jr. (R) of Garden City. The responsibilities of the office include presiding over meetings of the Town Council and directing the legislative and administrative function of that body. The position also entails creating and implementing the town's budget. One famous former supervisor was Republican Alfonse D'Amato, who later represented New York in the United States Senate from 1981 to 1999.

Prior to 1994, the town also had a Presiding Supervisor, who along with the Supervisor, sat on what was then Nassau County's main governmental body, the Board of Supervisors, along with the Supervisors of the towns of North Hempstead and Oyster Bay and the independent cities of Long Beach—formerly a part of Hempstead Town until its incorporation as a separate municipality in 1922—and Glen Cove, which had been carved out of Oyster Bay Town in 1917. Typically, the Presiding Supervisor, besides chairing the weekly county Board of Supervisors meetings, acted as the senior official in the town government with the Supervisor in a more junior, subordinate role; a number of Supervisors moved up to Presiding Supervisor whenever that office became vacant, including, in succession during the 1970s, Ralph G. Caso and Francis T. Purcell, both of whom later went on to become the county executive, and then Al D'Amato, before he moved up to the Senate. Having the Presiding Supervisor on the county board along with the Supervisor gave Hempstead—by far the most populous of the county's three towns and two cities—the most clout on that body. However, in 1993–94, a federal judge ruled that the board's makeup violated the one-person, one-vote constitutional principle and also gave no representation to the country's growing minority population. As a result of that ruling, the Board of Supervisors was replaced by a 19-member county legislature. Gregory P. Peterson served as the last Presiding Supervisor, as the position was abolished with the demise of the county board.
The Current Tax Collector is Jeanine Driscoll.

The Town Council comprises six voting members, elected from a councilmanic district. Their primary function is to adopt the annual budget, adopting and amending the town code and the building zone ordinances, adopting all traffic regulations, and hearing applications for changes of zone and special exceptions to zoning codes.

As of 2022, the council members are:
 Dorothy L. Goosby (D-Hempstead Village)
 Thomas E. Muscarella (R-Garden City)
 Melissa Miller (R-Atlantic Beach)
 Anthony P. D'Esposito (R-Island Park)(Elected to US House of Representatives NY-04, beginning in January 2023)
 Chris Carini (R-Seaford)
 Dennis Dunne, Sr. (R-Levittown)

Other elected officials in the town include the clerk and the receiver of taxes. The clerk is responsible for issuing birth, marriage, and death certificates and is considered the town's record keeper. The clerk is currently Kate Murray (R). The Receiver of Taxes is Jeanine C. Driscoll (R). The Town of Hempstead formerly elected the offices of Constable, Overseer of the Poor, Town Assessor, Town Treasurer, Town Auditors, Superintendent of Highways, Overseer of the Public Cemetery, and Justices of the Peace. Most of these functions have been included in other governments or made non-elected.

State and federal representation 
Hempstead is part of New York's 2nd, 4th and 5th Congressional Districts. District 2, represented by Andrew Garbarino (R-Sayville), is the southern and eastern portions of the town, while District 4, formerly represented for nine terms by Carolyn McCarthy (D-Mineola) and since the beginning of 2015 by Kathleen Rice (D-Garden City),  covers the northern and western portions of the town. Gregory Meeks represents District 5 which includes minority majority areas in the western portion of the Town like Elmont and North Valley Stream.

Hempstead is in parts of New York's 6th, 7th, 8th, and 9th Senatorial Districts. They are currently represented by Kevin Thomas (D), Anna Kaplan (D), John Brooks (D), and Todd Kaminsky (D), respectively.

Nine assembly districts are either within or partly within the town. They are Districts 12, 14–15, and 17–22. The assembly members are Joseph Saladino (R), Brian F. Curran (R), Michael Montesano (R), Thomas McKevitt (R), Earlene Hill Hooper (D), David G. McDonough (R), Melissa "Missy" Miller;(R), Edward Ra (R), and Michaelle Solages (D), respectively.

County legislators
Hempstead has 12 county legislative districts either within or in part of the town. They are districts 1–8, 13–15, and 19. The legislators who represent those districts are:
 Kevan Abrahams
 Siela Bynoe
 Carrie Solages
 Denise Ford
 Debra Mule
 C. William Gaylor, III
 Howard Kopel
 Vincent Muscarella
 Thomas McKevitt
 Laura Schaefer
 John Ferretti, Jr.
 Steven D. Rhoads

Sister city 
On September 12, 2016, the Town of Hempstead signed a Declaration of Cooperation with the Shomron Regional Council in the Israeli-controlled West Bank. This council represents 35 Israeli settlements in that region. Signing the pact was its proponent Councilmen Bruce Blakeman and Anthony D'Esposito and Supervisor Santino and Shomron leader Yossi Dagan.

Politics

Though the town government is still controlled by the Republicans (and has been for almost the entire history of the party), town voters in recent years leaned Democratic in elections on the state and federal level. In presidential elections since 1996, the Democrat has won in Hempstead (Bill Clinton received 56% in 1996, Al Gore received 58% in 2000 and John Kerry got 53% in 2004). Democratic Senator Chuck Schumer won Hempstead by a large margin in 2004, and Democratic County Executive Thomas Suozzi won in 2001 and 2005. Democratic candidate Hillary Clinton won 49 percent of voters in 2016, while President Donald Trump won 42 percent of voters. In 2021 Bruce Blakeman, a Republican Town Councilman, was elected Nassau County Executive in a surprising defeat of Democratic incumbent Laura Curran.

Transportation

Railroad lines
The Long Island Rail Road's Main Line runs through the northwestern part of the town with stations from Bellerose through Merillon Avenue in Garden City. The Hempstead Branch breaks away from the Main Line in Floral Park, and uses stations from Bellerose into Hempstead. The West Hempstead Branch runs from Valley Stream northeast to West Hempstead. Further south in the town, the Babylon Branch runs from the New York City Line into southern portions of the Town of Oyster Bay with stations between Valley Stream and Seaford. Also the Far Rockaway Branch branches off from Valley Stream and curves to the southwest from that station through Inwood before finally re-entering the city in the Rockaways. Just east of there, the Long Beach Branch breaks away at Lynbrook and runs southeast into Long Beach.

Bus service
The Town of Hempstead is served primarily by Nassau Inter-County Express bus routes, though some MTA Bus Routes enter Nassau County from Queens. The City of Long Beach also has a separate bus service.

Major roads

 Meadowbrook State Parkway
 Wantagh State Parkway
 Southern State Parkway
 Bay Parkway
 Loop Parkway
 Ocean Parkway
 New York State Route 25
Glen Cove Road
Peninsula Boulevard
 New York State Route 24
 New York State Route 27
Merrick Road
 New York State Route 102
 New York State Route 105
 New York State Route 106
 New York State Route 107
 New York State Route 135
 New York State Route 878

State parks 
 Hempstead Lake State Park
 Jones Beach State Park
 Valley Stream State Park

References

External links

 Town of Hempstead official website

 
1644 establishments in the Dutch Empire
Towns in Nassau County, New York
Towns in the New York metropolitan area
Towns on Long Island